The Department of Infrastructure, Energy and Resources (DIER) was the department of the Government of Tasmania responsible for management of the state's infrastructure. It reported to several ministers including Jim Cox and Michael Aird.  In 2014, it merged with the former Department of Economic Development, Tourism and the Arts to form the new Department of State Growth.

The Department was divided into divisions including a Corporate Services Division and the Office of the Secretary. In addition to its own Divisions, DIER also provides support to Private Forests Tasmania, Racing Services Tasmania and Forest Practices Authority.  The Executive Group (Senior Management Team) is made up of the Secretary, Deputy Secretaries and the General Manager Corporate Services. Each Division of DIER has responsibilities for infrastructure for social and economic development in Tasmania.

External links
 Department of Infrastructure, Energy and Resources

References

Infrastructure
Year of establishment unknown